Stephen F. Hatfield (January 4, 1924 – March 31, 2007) was a Canadian football player who played for the Ottawa Rough Riders. He won the Grey Cup with them in 1951. He previously played football at and attended the Shippensburg University of Pennsylvania. In 1950, Hatfield was drafted by the New York Giants of the National Football League. He is a member of the Shippenburg Raiders Hall of Fame. He died in 2007.

References

1924 births
2007 deaths
Ottawa Rough Riders players
American expatriates in Canada